The 1982 Champ Car season may refer to:
 the 1981–82 USAC Championship Car season, which included one race in 1982, the 66th Indianapolis 500
 the 1982–83 USAC Championship Car season, which included three races in 1982
 the 1982 CART PPG Indy Car World Series, sanctioned by CART, who later became Champ Car